The 2008–09 season was Blackburn Rovers' 121st season as a professional club.

The close season saw the departure of manager Mark Hughes to Manchester City. He was replaced by Paul Ince, although after a poor start to the campaign, Ince was sacked and succeeded by Sam Allardyce.

First-team squad
This squad consists of all players issued with a squad number.

Last update: 3 May 2009 15:00

Transfers

In

Out

 Fees are an estimate

Results

Pre-season

Premier League

FA Cup

League Cup

Season statistics

Final league table

References

External links
Official Club site
Player Statistics – RoversMad
Player Statistics – Official Club Site

Blackburn Rovers F.C. seasons
Blackburn Rovers